Murofushi (written: 室伏, 諸伏) is a Japanese surname. Notable people with the surname include:

, Japanese hammer thrower
, Japanese hammer thrower
Shinya Murofushi, Japanese mixed martial artist
, Japanese footballer
, Japanese discus and hammer thrower

Fictional characters 
, a character appearing in detective manga and anime, Case Closed (Detective Conan)
, a police and Hiromitsu's older brother character, appearing in Case Closed (Detective Conan)

Japanese-language surnames